The Atlantic Hotel in Downtown Missoula, was listed on the National Register of Historic Places in 1990. The building has also been known as the Circle Square Second Hand Store, the business which it housed in 1990.

It is a three-story brick building built in 1902.  It has a stepped parapet with battlements.

See also 
National Register of Historic Places listings in Missoula County, Montana

References

Hotel buildings completed in 1902
National Register of Historic Places in Missoula, Montana
Hotel buildings on the National Register of Historic Places in Montana
1902 establishments in Montana